Globe Life, based in McKinney, Texas, provides life and health insurance coverage nationwide, and has earned the A (Excellent) Financial Strength Rating as of June 2020. Globe Life and Accident Insurance Company has executive offices in Oklahoma City and McKinney, TX and is a subsidiary of Globe Life.

History
In 1951, the company was chartered by two longtime friends, Ralph Reece and John Singletary, with $60,000 of borrowed capital. Globe originally sold inexpensive but dependable life insurance protection to rural Oklahoma communities. Since 1951, Globe Life has grown in financial strength and reputation, consistently receiving high industry ratings. Today, Globe Life markets through direct mail, internet, and call center sales. The company's life insurance premium has grown from approximately $221 million in 1998 to approximately $813 million in 2018.

Major Globe Life sponsorships
On February 5, 2014, Globe Life and Accident Insurance Company purchased the naming rights to Globe Life Park in Arlington, the stadium of the Texas Rangers Major League Baseball Team in Arlington, Texas.  The agreement is for ten years starting in 2014 and going through the 2023 baseball season.

Globe Life and Texas Rangers Baseball Foundation partnered on a baseball and softball grant program again in 2015.

In addition to its partnership with the Texas Rangers, Globe Life is also the official insurance company of the Dallas Cowboys and partners with the organization through advertising and corporate events at the Cowboys’ stadium, AT&T Stadium in Arlington, Texas, and at the Dallas Cowboys’ headquarters and training facility in Frisco, Texas.

President & CEO
Charles F. Hudson was the Senior Vice President of Globe Life from August 2001 through August 2005. He became President and CEO in August 2005 and retired in November 2014. Bill Leavell was named President of Globe Life in October 2013.

Company reputation
The company has an A+ Better Business Bureau rating on a scale of A+ to F and has over 376 closed complaints. In a 2002 lawsuit, Globe Life was fined a civil penalty of $5,000 for failing to pay interest on death claims in Oregon.

Employee Service Division
In 1972, Globe Life formed its Employee Services Division (ESD) to offer supplemental life and health insurance for federal and state employees already covered by Federal Employee Government Life Insurance, or FEGLI.

References

Life insurance companies of the United States
Financial services companies established in 1951
Companies based in Oklahoma City
Globe Life Subsidiaries
1951 establishments in Oklahoma
Health insurance companies of the United States